Carsten „Erle“ Wolters (born 25 July 1969) is a German footballer coach and former player who works as assistant coach at Rot-Weiss Essen. He played as a defender for MSV Duisburg, Borussia Dortmund and Wattenscheid 09.

Honours
 Bundesliga: 1995–96
 DFL-Supercup: 1996

References

External links
 
 

1969 births
Living people
Sportspeople from Gelsenkirchen
German footballers
Footballers from North Rhine-Westphalia
Association football midfielders
Bundesliga players
SG Wattenscheid 09 players
Borussia Dortmund players
MSV Duisburg players
West German footballers